Francisco Pérez Muñoz (1916–1951) was a singer, composer, and guitarist from Guatemala.

Biography

Pérez was born on April 25, 1916, in Huehuetenango, Guatemala to José Pérez and Luz Muñoz. At the age of 6, he acted in the municipal theater. In 1927, he moved with his family to Quetzaltenango, where he took on various roles as a singer and orator.

Pérez made his grand debut in 1935 in the municipal theater of Quetzaltenango, accompanied by Juan Sandoval on piano. Later he formed the Trío Quetzaltecos with Manolo Rosales and José Alvarez. When Quetzaltenango radio station TGQ launched in 1937, he aired a series of concerts. Pérez achieved fame for his waltz, Luna de Xelajú (1944), which has become an element in Guatemalan cultural identity. The song figures in the repertory of most singers, choirs, marimba players and musical groups in Guatemala.

Pérez died October 27, 1951, in a plane crash at El Petén, Guatemala, along with his pianist, Mario Lara Montealegre, and other musicians. He was 34 years old.

Works
 Luna de Xelajú
 Tzanjuyú
 Azabia
 Nenita
 Arrepentimiento
 Patoja linda
 Madrecita
 Chichicastenango (guaracha)

Guatemalan composers
Male composers
People from Huehuetenango Department
Victims of aviation accidents or incidents in Guatemala
1916 births
1951 deaths
Guatemalan male singers
20th-century composers
20th-century male singers